Vicky Sunohara (born May 18, 1970) is a Canadian ice hockey coach, former ice hockey player, and three-time Olympic medallist. She has been described as "the Wayne Gretzky of women's hockey" and is recognized as a trailblazer and pioneer for the sport. In 2020, Sunohara was named to "TSN Hockey’s All-Time Women’s Team Canada," in recognition of her status as one of Canada’s best female hockey players of all time.

Sunohara is currently the head coach of the Varsity Blues women's ice hockey team of the University of Toronto. She was nationally recognized in 2019–20 and 2021-22 as the U Sports Women's Ice Hockey Coach of the Year and was named the 2019–20 Ontario University Athletics (OUA) Female Coach of the Year across all sports.

Playing career

Sunohara began to play hockey as a small child and the love of the game came naturally to her as her late father, David Sunohara, was a hockey enthusiast who played college ice hockey with the Ryerson Rams.

Sunohara's father built a backyard rink in the winters and introduced his daughter to skating at the age of two and a half. "My mother said that from the minute my father introduced me to hockey, I wouldn't do anything else," Sunohara commented, "I just loved it."

She began playing organized hockey on a boys team at age 5, but was eventually banned from the boys' leagues due to her gender.  She ended up dominating every level of girls' competition.

Sunohara attended Stephen Leacock Collegiate Institute in Scarborough, a suburban district of Toronto, where she was a standout on the women's ice hockey, field hockey, soccer, and flag football teams.

Following high school, Sunohara received a full athletic scholarship to Northeastern University in Boston, where she played two seasons with the Northeastern Huskies women's ice hockey program in the ECAC Hockey conference of the NCAA Division I. In her freshman season, she led the Huskies in scoring as they claimed the 1989 ECAC Hockey conference championship title and was recognized as the ECAC Rookie of the Year. In the 1989–90 season, she led the team in scoring again and was named to the NCAA All-American team. Across 45 games with Northeastern, she scored 122 points (78 goals and 44 assists).

Sunohara also played hockey for the University of Toronto, where her team won the Ontario University Athletics women's ice hockey championships in 1990–91 and 1991–92. She was named the OUA women's ice hockey Rookie of the Year in 1990–91.

When she was not involved in international competition, Sunohara was the captain and assistant coach for the Brampton Canadettes Thunder in the Canadian Women's Hockey League (formerly the Brampton Thunder of the National Women's Hockey League). Sunohara participated in several Esso women's hockey nationals with Brampton. She was named the top forward of the tournament in 2005 and her team, the Brampton Thunder, won the national title in 2006.

Sunohara also played in the Central Ontario Women's Hockey League with the Scarborough Firefighters (1990–1994), Toronto Red Wings (1994–1996), and the Newtonbrook Panthers (1996–97).

International play 

Sunohara won an Olympic silver medal at the 1998 Winter Olympics in Nagano, Japan. She continued with an Olympic gold medal at the 2002 Winter Olympics in Salt Lake City, Utah, and another gold medal at the 2006 Winter Olympics in Turin, Italy.

Besides the 1998, 2002 and 2006 Winter Olympics, Sunohara represented Canada in numerous international ice hockey competitions. She won seven gold medals at the International Ice Hockey Federation (IIHF) World Championships, the first one coming in 1990.  In total, she won 15 gold medals and 3 silver medals as a member of Canada's national team.

Sunohara excelled for Team Canada in major tournaments. She had 13 points in 16 games during three Olympics, and 41 points in 40 games during eight World Championships. Sunohara finished her career with Team Canada with 119 points (56 goals and 62 assists) in 164 games. As of 2020, she continued to rank in Canada's all-time top ten for games played, goals, and points.

Coaching and leadership
Sunohara is credited with helping to expand the popularity of women's ice hockey, having trained and mentored many young girls in the sport. Along with instructing at several hockey camps and clinics, she served as an assistant hockey coach at the Canadian women's national under-18 and under-19 team evaluation camps. In 2022, Sunohara was an assistant coach on Canada’s under-18 women’s ice hockey team, which won gold at the world championships. For two years, she was the Director of Women's Hockey at The Hill Academy in Vaughan, Ontario.

In 2011, Sunohara was named head coach of the University of Toronto Varsity Blues women's ice hockey team.

In 2020, Sunohara guided University of Toronto to winning the Ontario University Athletics women’s ice hockey title. U Sports, the governing body of university sport in Canada, named Sunohara the 2019–20 National Women's Ice Hockey Coach of the Year. Ontario University Athletics also named her the 2019–20 Women's Ice Hockey Coach of the Year, in addition to the Female Coach of the Year across all sports. Sunohara repeated as the U Sports Women’s Ice Hockey Coach of the Year in the 2021-22 season.

In 2022, The Hockey News ranked Sunohara as having the strongest qualifications to break the gender barrier and become the first female head coach in the National Hockey League.

Sunohara's coaching philosophy goes beyond teaching skills and she  has described coaching as "more than just teaching a wrist shot or slap shot." She believes in instilling "Olympic values," like integrity, accountability, and commitment and endeavors to mold her team members into not just better players but better people.

Well known for her affable manner and engaging personality, Sunohara has been described as "one of the nicest people in all of hockey," while at the same time being a focused and intense competitor. During her tenure with Team Canada, Sunohara was counted on for her veteran leadership and was the assistant captain of the Canadian national team from 2001 until her retirement in 2008 at the age of 38.

A former Team Canada teammate, Jennifer Botterill, described Sunohara as "the most positive, supportive, energetic person you'll meet."

About Sunohara, Sami Jo Small, another former Team Canada teammate, said:

I have had the privilege of playing with some pretty amazing people but none have struck me as born leaders like Vicky Sunohara...She rallies the troops in desperate times and tells funny jokes when the pressure is mounting...She's always there for her teammates and always willing to do whatever it takes to win. She makes those around her not only better hockey players but also better people...In the ten years I played on the team I never saw another player touch as many people in such a positive way as Vicky Sunohara.Sunohara's former Team Canada coach, Melody Davidson, said of Sunohara: "She'll do everything she can for this team. She's just a tremendous person."

In 2009, David Miller, then Mayor of Toronto, remarked:

Not only is Vicky one of Canada's elite female athletes, she is a Torontonian and the granddaughter of immigrants representing the city's diversity which is one of our most important strengths. Vicky is well respected in our community and has worked tirelessly to help the youth of Toronto -- especially young girls -- develop their skills and fulfill their dreams.

Other awards and accomplishments
Sunohara was inducted into the City of Brampton Sports Hall of Fame, alongside national team teammates Jayna Hefford and Sami Jo Small. In 2006, she was named an inaugural member of the Scarborough Walk of Fame.

At the age of 36, Sunohara was named Ontario's Female Athlete of the Year for 2006.

Sunohara has been acknowledged by the Hockey Hall of Fame as one of the notable women ice hockey players of all time.

In 2009, Sunohara was selected by the Vancouver Olympic Organizing Committee to be Toronto's final torchbearer in the 2010 Winter Olympics torch relay as the Vancouver-bound Olympic flame passed through Ontario on its cross-country journey. She lit the cauldron before thousands of spectators at Nathan Phillips Square.

In 2012, Sunohara was inducted into the Canadian Olympic Hall of Fame with the roster of the 2006 Canadian women's national team that participated in the women's ice hockey tournament of the 2006 Winter Olympics.

In 2018, Sunohara was inducted into the Toronto Sport Hall of Honour in the sport legends category.

In 2018, Sunohara was featured in the Canadian Olympic Committee “Virtue and Victory” campaign, showcasing the stories of athletes who exemplify both Canadian and Olympic values. Sunohara, along with Hayley Wickenheiser and Caroline Ouelette, were recognized for leadership and excellence.

In 2019, Sunohara was appointed Honorary Lieutenant Colonel of The Queen's Own Rifles of Canada, a Primary Reserve regiment of the Canadian Armed Forces, based in Toronto. “I was shocked and humbled,” said HLCol Sunohara. “What came to my mind was ‘not worthy.’ But obviously I have a tremendous amount of respect and gratitude for those who serve our country. To be able to contribute in some small way is quite rewarding.”

According to Regimental Sergeant Major Donovan O’Halloran, Sunohara was a “natural choice” for this appointment, commenting:Vicky is a leader in our community on several levels. She is a role model for the pursuit of excellence, she has achieved the highest measure of success in her sport and she continues to serve her community through coaching, mentoring and volunteering. It is a great privilege to have a woman of such distinction accept this important role.In 2020, Sunohara was named to "TSN Hockey’s All-Time Women’s Team Canada" and described as "the ultimate glue player," meaning an egoless leader who put the needs of her team above everything else and held the team together. Sunohara was the epitome of a team player.

In 2020, the Japanese Canadian Cultural Centre named Sunohara a recipient of the Sakura Award, which recognizes exceptional contributions made by individuals to the promotion and exchange of Japanese culture and enhancing awareness of Japanese heritage within Canada and abroad.

Sunohara was one of six Canadian women's ice hockey players honoured during the 2021 World Junior Ice Hockey Championship. Sunohara and the other honourees were described as “some of the greatest female hockey players Canada has ever produced,” with their “legacies as trailblazers for the women’s game” having been well documented.

Personal life
Sunohara was born in Scarborough, Ontario. She is of Japanese and Ukrainian heritage. She is a graduate of the University of Toronto with a Bachelor of Physical and Health Education degree.

Following her retirement from international hockey in 2008, Sunohara and her husband Tal welcomed twin boys in 2009. As a busy mother, she coaches her sons' hockey team.

Sunohara makes frequent appearances as a guest speaker and donates a considerable amount of time to charitable and community organizations. Beginning in 2001, she served as a spokesperson for the Youth Assisting Youth program of United Way of Canada. In 2010, Sunohara was appointed to the Board of Directors of the Canadian Sport Centre Ontario (CSCO), a non-profit organization committed to assisting high-performance athletes and coaches achieve excellence in international competition.

References

External links
 
 Toronto Star article - "Sunohara to get last laugh as Canadians Think Pink"
 Toronto Sun article - "Sunohara's Nagano reunion"
 New York Times article - Sunohara described as "the Wayne Gretzky of women's hockey"
 Profiles of the Greatest Hockey Legends
 Sunohara's beauty makeover
 Sunohara's website 
 Sunohara's biography on Brampton Thunder's website
 Baycrest International Pro-Am Hockey Tournament website

1970 births
Living people
Brampton Thunder players
Canadian people of Ukrainian descent
Canadian sportspeople of Japanese descent
Canadian women's ice hockey centres
Ice hockey players at the 1998 Winter Olympics
Ice hockey players at the 2002 Winter Olympics
Ice hockey players at the 2006 Winter Olympics
Medalists at the 1998 Winter Olympics
Medalists at the 2002 Winter Olympics
Medalists at the 2006 Winter Olympics
Northeastern Huskies women's ice hockey players
Olympic gold medalists for Canada
Olympic ice hockey players of Canada
Olympic medalists in ice hockey
Olympic silver medalists for Canada
Sportspeople from Scarborough, Toronto
Ice hockey people from Toronto
Toronto Varsity Blues ice hockey players